Wai is a village in Bajura District in the Seti Zone of north-western Nepal. At the time of the 1991 Nepal census it had a population of 2,878 and had 551 houses in the village.

References

Populated places in Bajura District